The Fighting Dervishes of the Desert is a 1912 American silent film produced by Kalem Company and distributed by General Film Company. It was directed by Sidney Olcott with himself, Gene Gauntier and Jack J. Clark in the leading roles.

Cast
 Gene Gauntier - Zahrah
 Jack J. Clark - Hassan Ali
 Robert Vignola - Ishmail
 J.P. McGowan - Father Moosa
 Allan Farnham

Production notes
The film was shot in Luxor, Egypt.

External links

 The Fighting Dervishes of the Desert website dedicated to Sidney Olcott

1912 films
American silent short films
Films set in Egypt
Films shot in Egypt
Films directed by Sidney Olcott
1912 adventure films
American black-and-white films
American adventure films
1910s American films
Silent adventure films